Louis Charles Petersen (19 April 1897 – 25 June 1961) was a dual-code rugby footballer who represented New Zealand in rugby union and rugby league.

Early Years
Petersen served with the New Zealand Expeditionary Force in World War I and it was here that he developed his football skills, playing for the "Trench team".

Rugby Nion Career
Petersen began his career with the Marist Old Boys club in Christchurch and in 1919 was first selected to represent Canterbury. He made the South Island side in 1919, 1920 and 1921.

In 1922 Petersen was called up to the All Blacks and he played in eight games for New Zealand, although he did not appear in any Test matches.

In 1924 Marist Old Boys became locked in a dispute with the Canterbury Rugby Union and quit, instead fielding rugby league and soccer teams. Petersen followed the club, taking up rugby league.

Rugby league Career
Petersen made an immediate impact and was one of the six Marist Old Boys players who were selected to represent New Zealand that season. In total, Petersen played in three Test matches for New Zealand in rugby league. He captained Cantebury in 1925 and played for the South Island in 1926.

Petersen was part of the 1926–1927 tour of Great Britain that was marred by strike and he was one of the seven players suspended for life by the New Zealand Rugby League on his return. The ban was lifted in 1962, one year after Petersen's death.

Death
Upon his death in 1961, the Press wrote a lengthy obituary detailing his skills as a rugby and rugby league player. It was mentioned that his nickname have been "Big Pete".

References

1897 births
1961 deaths
Canterbury rugby league team players
Canterbury rugby union players
Dual-code rugby internationals
New Zealand rugby union players
New Zealand international rugby union players
New Zealand rugby league players
New Zealand national rugby league team players
New Zealand military personnel of World War I
Rugby league players from Canterbury, New Zealand
Rugby league second-rows
Rugby union players from Canterbury, New Zealand
South Island rugby league team players
South Island rugby union players
Sportspeople from Akaroa